Young Lithuania is a nationalist political party in Lithuania. The party has no seats in the Seimas, European Parliament or local municipalities. The leader of the party is Stanislovas Buškevičius.

History 

The party was established in 1994 after Political Parties' Act was introduced. The newly formed organisation had its best performance in Kaunas. Here, it managed to elect its leader, Stanislovas Buškevičius, as member of Seimas between 1996 and 2004.

Following the municipal elections in 2011, the party received 6.49% of the votes in Kaunas city municipality council and won 4 seats there. It had no seats in the other municipalities. In the municipal elections in 2015 the party failed to win any seats.

In the 2016 parliamentary election, the party participated in a coalition with Lithuanian Nationalists and received 0.54% of the vote.

Election results

References

Nationalist parties in Lithuania
National conservative parties